Betina Jozami (born 8 September 1988) is a retired tennis player from Argentina. In her career, she won seven singles and 15 doubles titles on the ITF Circuit.

Jozami participated at the 2007 Pan American Games where she won the gold medal with Jorgelina Cravero in doubles and the bronze medal in singles. She also represented her country at the 2008 Summer Olympics. Betina has a degree on Business Administration.

Career
Betina started playing tennis when she was eight years in Paraná, her hometown, at the Urquiza Tennis Club with her coach Alejandro Rudi. She comes from a sports family of Lebanese descent.

She represented her country in several occasions, the South American Tournament in 2000, the Orange Bowl in 2003, and the Junior Davis Cup in 2004.

Betina obtained the gold medal in doubles with Jorgelina Cravero, and the bronze medal in singles at the 2007 Pan American Games.

In 2008, Betina managed to access the second round of doubles at the 2008 Summer Olympics with Gisela Dulko. Betina also represented her country in Fed Cup competition (win/loss record 2–4).

In addition to her sports career, Betina is business administrator graduated in the University of San Martín.

She represented the University of San Martin and the Argentine National Team of Tennis at the 2011 Summer Universiade in Shenzhen, China where she met her current husband Emerson Burla. Two years later, they represented their country at the 2013 Universiade in Kazan, Russia.

Between 2015 and 2017, she lived and worked as a consultant in Mexico City. During this period, Betina held a tennis exhibition with Andy Roddick, Melisa Torres and James Blake.

Currently, she works at Weymouth Club as a High Performance Coach and as a freelance in the field of eCommerce. Since 2018, Betina has resided in Boston, Massachusetts.

ITF Circuit finals

Singles: 10 (7 titles, 3 runner-ups)

Doubles: 27 (15 titles, 12 runner-ups)

References

External links

 
 
 

1988 births
Living people
Argentine female tennis players
Sportspeople of Lebanese descent
Olympic tennis players of Argentina
Pan American Games gold medalists for Argentina
Argentine people of Lebanese descent
People from Paraná, Entre Ríos
Tennis players at the 2008 Summer Olympics
Tennis players at the 2007 Pan American Games
Pan American Games bronze medalists for Argentina
Pan American Games medalists in tennis
Medalists at the 2007 Pan American Games
Sportspeople from Entre Ríos Province
21st-century Argentine women